Satyajit Ray Film and Television Institute (SRFTI) is a film and television institute located in Kolkata, West Bengal, India. Named after Indian filmmaker Satyajit Ray, the institute provides higher and professional education and technical expertise in the art and technique of film-making and television production. Established in 1995, the institute is an autonomous society funded by Ministry of Information and Broadcasting, Government of India.

A member of CILECT (International Liaison Centre of Schools of Cinema and Television), in 2019 SRFTI was ranked among the best film schools in the world, along with the Film and Television Institute of India (FTII) and the National School of Drama, New Delhi by the CEOWorld Magazine.

History 
The SRFTI was established in 1995, and registered as a Society on 18 August 1995 under the West Bengal Societies Registration Act, 1961, and is an autonomous society funded by Ministry of Information and Broadcasting, Government of India. It has been named after acclaimed Indian film director, Satyajit Ray. The first session began on September 1, 1996, while Dr Debasish Majumdar joined as the institute's first director in 1997.

Administration

The institute is governed by an autonomous body with Governing Council, Standing Finance Committee and an Academic Council. The institute is under the Ministry of Information and Broadcasting of the Government of India.

It has the following departments in the Film Wing:
 Department of Direction & Screenplay Writing
 Department of Sound Recording and Design
 Department of Editing
 Department of Cinematography
 Department of Producing for Film & Television
 Department of Animation Cinema

and the following departments in the Electronic & Digital Media Wing :

 Department of Electronic and Digital Media Management
 Department of Writing for Electronic and Digital Media
 Department of Direction & Producing for Electronic and Digital Media
 Department of Cinematography for Electronic and Digital Media
 Department of Editing for Electronic and Digital Media
 Department of Sound for Electronic and Digital Media

Notable faculty
Subrata Mitra

Notable alumni

Direction & Screenplay Writing 

Vipin Vijay (Chitrasutram)
Anjalika Sharma (Meena Jha - Best First Non-Feature Film of a Director at 48th National Film Awards)
Amal Neerad (Big B, Iyobinte Pusthakam, Bheeshma Parvam)
Sagar Ballary (Bheja Fry, Hum Tum Shabana)
Tridib Poddar (Khoj - official selection in competition in the Cinefoundation section at Cannes Film Festival, 2002)
Anirban Dutta (In For Motion - Best Environment/Conservation/Preservation Film and Best Agriculture Film at 57th National Film Awards)
Haobam Paban Kumar (AFSPA 1958 - Best Non-Feature Film at 56th National Film Awards, Mr. India - Best Film on Social Issues at 57th National Film Awards)
Bishnu Dev Halder (Bagher Bacha - Best Film on Social Issues at 55th National Film Awards)
Kanu Behl (Oye Lucky! Lucky Oye!, Love Sex Aur Dhokha, Titli)

Cinematography 

 Raktim Mondal (Cheeni Kum, Ami, Yasin Ar Amar Madhubala)
Dipayan Chaudhuri (Hoi Choi, Hawa Bodol, Maach Misti & More)
Sivakumar Vijayan (Vidiyum Munn, Saala Khadoos)
Siddharth Diwan (Titli, Bulbbul, Jayeshbhai Jordaar)

Sound Recording & Design 

Subhadeep Sengupta (Chitrasutram - Best Audiography (sound design) at 58th National Film Awards, Chalo Let's Go)
Tapas Nayak (Bheja Fry 2, Kachcha Limboo, Raavan)
Partha Barman (Bishar Blues - Best Non-Feature Film Audiography at 54th National Film Awards)
Sanjay Chaturvedi (Kai Po Che, Zindagai Na Milegi Dobara)
Hitesh Chaurasia (Gajaar: Journey of the Soul - V. Shantaram Best Sound Award 2012)
Pritam Das (Love Sex Aur Dhokha, Shanghai, Ladies vs. Ricky Bahl)

Editing 

Saikat S. Ray (Hope Dies Last in War - Best Non-Feature Film Editing at 55th National Film Awards)
Atanu Mukherjee (Monsoon Shootout)
Tinni Mitra (Germ - Best Non-Feature Film Editing at 58th National Film Awards)
Namrata Rao (Ishqiya, Band Baaja Baaraat, Kahaani, 2 States, Fan)

Controversy 
The institute has been in the news multiple times for unaddressed issues of sexual harassment. The first noted instance was in 2015 where a student allegedly tried to commit suicide after a professor allegedly raped her. In 2017 students protested en masse alleging harassment and "moral policing". In 2018, another student complained about sexual harassment and media reported mismanagement of the case.

See also 

 Cinema of India
 Bhartendu Natya Academy
 Film and Television Institute of India
 State Institute of Film and Television
 Government Film and Television Institute
 K. R. Narayanan National Institute of Visual Science and Arts
 M.G.R. Government Film and Television Training Institute
 Jyoti Chitraban Film and Television Institute
 Biju Patnaik Film and Television Institute of Odisha

References

External links
Satyajit Ray Film and Television Institute Official Website

Satyajit Ray
Universities and colleges in Kolkata
Film schools in India
Educational institutions established in 1995
Ministry of Information and Broadcasting (India)
1995 establishments in West Bengal